Levi Strauss & Co. is an American clothing company known worldwide for its Levi's brand of denim jeans. It was founded in May 1853 when German-Jewish immigrant Levi Strauss moved from Buttenheim, Bavaria, to San Francisco, California, to open a West Coast branch of his brothers' New York dry goods business. Although the corporation is registered in Delaware, the company's corporate headquarters is located in Levi's Plaza in San Francisco.

History

Origin and formation (1853–1890s)

German-Jewish immigrant Levi Strauss started his trading business at the 90 Sacramento Street address in San Francisco and then moved the location to 62 Sacramento Street. In 1858, the company was listed as Strauss, Levi (David Stern & Levis Strauss) importers clothing, etc. 63 & 65 Sacramento St. (today, on the current grounds of the 353 Sacramento Street Lobby) in the San Francisco Directory with Strauss serving as its sales manager and his brother-in-law, David Stern, as its manager.

Jacob Davis, a Latvian-Jewish immigrant, was a Reno, Nevada, tailor who frequently purchased bolts of denim cloth from Levi Strauss & Co.'s wholesale house. After one of Davis's customers kept purchasing cloth to reinforce torn pants, he had an idea to use copper rivets to reinforce the points of strain, such as on the pocket corners and at the base of the button fly. Davis did not have the money needed to purchase a patent, so he wrote to Strauss suggesting that they go into business together. After Strauss accepted Davis's offer, on May 20, 1873, the two men received  from the United States Patent and Trademark Office. The patented rivet was later incorporated into the company's jean design and advertisements. Contrary to an advertising campaign suggesting that Levi Strauss sold his first jeans to gold miners during the California Gold Rush (which peaked in 1849), the manufacturing of denim overalls only began in the 1870s. In 1890, the rivet patent went into public domain, lot numbers were assigned the products that were being manufactured, and "501" was used to designate the famous copper-riveted waist overalls.

Growth in popularity (1910s–1960s)

Modern jeans began to appear in the 1920s, but sales were largely confined to the working people of the western United States, such as cowboys, lumberjacks, and railroad workers. Levi's jeans apparently were first introduced to the East during the dude ranch craze of the 1930s, when vacationing Easterners returned home with tales (and usually examples) of the hard-wearing pants with rivets. Another boost came in World War II, when blue jeans were declared an essential commodity and were sold only to people engaged in defense work.

Between the 1950s and 1980s, Levi's jeans became popular among a wide range of youth subcultures, including greasers, mods, rockers, and hippies. Levi's popular shrink-to-fit 501s were sold in a unique sizing arrangement: the indicated size referred to the size of the jeans prior to shrinking, and the shrinkage was substantial. The company still produces these unshrunk, uniquely sized jeans. Although popular lore (abetted by company marketing) holds that the original design remains unaltered, this is not the case: the crotch rivet and waist cinch were removed during World War II to conform to War Production Board requirements to conserve metal and were not replaced after the war. Additionally, the back pocket rivets, which had been covered in denim since 1937, were removed completely in the 1950s due to complaints they scratched furniture.

Blue jeans era (1960s–1980s)

From the early 1960s through the mid-1970s, Levi Strauss experienced significant growth in its business as the more casual look of the 1960s and 1970s ushered in the "blue jeans craze" and served as a catalyst for the brand. Levi's, under the leadership of Walter Haas, Peter Haas Sr., Paul Glasco, and George P. Simpkins Sr., expanded the firm's clothing line by adding new fashions and models, such as stone-washed jeans through the acquisition of Great Western Garment Company (GWG), a Canadian clothing manufacturer. The acquisition led to the introduction of the modern "stone washing" technique, which is still in use by Levi Strauss. Simpkins is credited with the company's record-paced expansion of its manufacturing capacity from 16 plants to more than 63 plants in the United States – along with 23 overseas – from 1964 to 1974. Levi's expansion under Simpkins was accomplished without a single unionized employee as a result of Levi's and the Haas family's strong stance on human rights and Simpkins' use of "pay for performance" manufacturing from the sewing machine operator level up. As a result, Levi's plants were voted the highest-performing, best-organized, and cleanest textile facilities of their time. From a company with 15 salespeople, two plants, and almost no business east of the Mississippi in 1946, the organization grew over 30 years to include a sales force of more than 22,000, with 50 plants and offices in 35 countries.

In the 1980s, the company closed around 60 of its manufacturing plants because of financial difficulties and strong competition.

The Dockers brand, which was launched in 1986 and is sold largely through department store chains, helped the company grow through the mid-1990s, as denim sales began to fade. Dockers were introduced into Europe in 1996 and led by CEO Jorge Bardina. Levi Strauss attempted to sell the Dockers division in 2004 to relieve part of the company's $2.6 billion outstanding debt.

Brand competition (1990s)

By the 1990s, Levi's faced competition from other brands and cheaper products from overseas, and began accelerating the pace of its U.S. factory closures and its use of offshore subcontracting agreements. In 1991, Levi Strauss became implicated in a scandal involving pants made in the Northern Mariana Islands: some 3% of Levi's jeans sold annually with the "Made in the USA" label were shown to have been made by Chinese laborers under what the U.S. Department of Labor called "slavelike" conditions. , most Levi's jeans are made outside the U.S., although a few of the higher-end, more expensive styles are still made domestically.

Cited for sub-minimum wages, seven-day work weeks with 12-hour shifts, poor living conditions, and other indignities, Tan Holdings Corporation, Levi Strauss' Marianas subcontractor, paid what were then the largest fines in U.S. labor history, distributing more than $9 million in restitution to some 1,200 employees. Levi Strauss claimed no knowledge of the offenses, severed ties to the Tan family, and instituted labor reforms and inspection practices in its offshore facilities.

The activist group Fuerza Unida (United Force) formed following the January 1990 closure of a plant in San Antonio, Texas, in which 1,150 seamstresses – some of whom had worked for Levi Strauss for decades – saw their jobs exported to Costa Rica. During the mid-and late 1990s, Fuerza Unida picketed the Levi Strauss headquarters in San Francisco and staged hunger strikes and sit-ins in protest of the company's labor policies.

The company took on multibillion-dollar debt in February 1996 to help finance a series of leveraged stock buyouts among family members. At the time, shares in Levi Strauss stock were not publicly traded; as of 2016, the firm was owned almost entirely by indirect descendants and collateral relatives of Levi Strauss, whose four nephews inherited the San Francisco dry-goods firm after their uncle's death in 1902. The corporation's bonds are traded publicly, as are shares of the company's Japanese affiliate, Levi Strauss Japan K.K.

In June 1996, the company offered to pay its workers an unusual dividend of up to $750 million in six years, having halted an employee-stock plan at the time of the internal family buyout. However, the company failed to make cash-flow targets, and no worker dividends were paid.

The annual sales of the brand increased in 1997 to reach $7.1 billion.

Later developments (2000–present)

In 2002, Levi Strauss began a close business collaboration with Walmart, producing a special line of "Signature" jeans and other clothes for exclusive sale in Walmart stores until 2006.

Levi Strauss leads the apparel industry in trademark infringement cases, filing nearly 100 lawsuits against competitors over a six-year period from 2001. Most cases center on the alleged imitation of Levi's back pocket double arc stitching pattern (U.S. trademark No. 1,139,254), which Levi's filed for a trademark in 1978. Levi's has successfully sued Guess, Polo Ralph Lauren, Esprit Holdings, Zegna, Zumiez, and Lucky Brand Jeans, among other companies.

In 2002, the company closed its Valencia Street plant in San Francisco, which had opened the same year of the city's April 1906 earthquake. By the end of 2003, the closure of Levi's last U.S. factory in San Antonio ended 150 years of jeans made in the United States. Production of a few higher-end, more expensive styles of jeans resumed in the U.S. several years later.

By 2007, Levi Strauss was again profitable after declining sales in nine of the previous 10 years. Its total annual sales of just over $4 billion were $3 billion less than during its peak performance in the mid-1990s. After more than two decades of family ownership, rumors of a possible public stock offering were floated in the media in July 2007.

In 2010, the company partnered with Filson, an outdoor goods manufacturer in Seattle, to produce a high-end line of jackets and workwear.

In 2011, the firm hired Chip Bergh as the president and chief executive of the brand. In that same year, they also established more than 20 different waterless manufacturing techniques, reducing the exceptionally high amounts of water used to create denim every year. Levi's is now the most sustainable brand of jeans in the world when it comes to water usage.

On May 8, 2013, the NFL's San Francisco 49ers announced that Levi Strauss & Co. had purchased the naming rights to their new stadium in Santa Clara, California. The naming rights deal called for Levi's to pay $220.3 million to the city of Santa Clara and to the 49ers over 20 years, with an option to extend the deal for another five years for around $75 million.

, Levi Strauss Signature jeans are sold in 110 countries. In 2016, the company reported revenues of $4.6 billion.

On July 13, 2017, Levi Strauss heir Bill Goldman died in a private plane crash near Sonoma, California.

In 2017, Levi Strauss & Co. released a "smart jacket", an apparel they developed in partnership with Google. After two years of collaboration, the result was a denim jacket set at $350.

In March 2019, Levi's debuted on the New York Stock Exchange under the ticker "LEVI". Levi Strauss was valued at $6.6 billion as its IPO priced above the target.

In September 2019, Levi's won final judgment on a trademark infringement in Guangzhou, China. The case centered on the "arcuate design on two pockets at the back of jeans", which has been protected in China since its registration there in 2005. The company won damages and costs in addition to a ban on future infringements. The infringer's ignorance of the trademark was no bar to punishment.

In 2019, Levi's became one of only two major clothing companies with commitments in line with the Paris Agreement's goal of limiting global average temperature increase to 1.5 degrees Celsius.

In 2020, Levi Strauss & Co. is expected to have completely replaced chemical usage to lasers in order to cut and design ripped parts of jeans. In December 2019, the Engage for Good (formerly Cause Marketing Forum) organization awarded the company the Golden Halo Award for 2020 for their advancements in corporate social impact.

On August 5, 2021, they announced the acquisition of Beyond Yoga, entering into the activewear market. They expect the acquisition will contribute to more than $100 million to net revenue per year. It was announced senior executives are to speak with AI expert Blake Van Leer at the LA eCommerce Summit about their digital strategies and AI in 2023. It was announced January 2023, Levi will begin accepting old pairs of jeans to recycle into more denim in a campaign to go green.

Cultural impact
Levi's has been worn by people of all backgrounds – from miners to actors to Nobel Prize recipients. Marlon Brando and Albert Einstein wore Levi's, and Einstein's leather jacket was made by Levi Strauss & Co. in the 1930s and sold at auction house Christie's in July 2016 for £110,500.

Levi's uses several dozen techniques to exclude competitors from its field, both in its garments and in its advertising and storefront presence. Amongst other techniques, its sewn patterns and garment labels distinguish it from competitor products. It also has fenced off several word marks, like "Levi's", "Red Tab", "Orange Tab", "Silvertab", "501", "505", "517", "550", "569": and "Dockers". Taken together, these form part of what might be called the Levi's experience. For example, Levi's has used its "arcuate design" on the back pockets of its jeans since 1873. In 1943, the firm registered this design as a trademark at the USPTO. The arcuate design is one method it uses to exclude competition in the garment field as well as others. Levi's had trademarked this design in more than 100 jurisdictions as of 2019.

In 2022, it was reported that a pair of Levi's jeans from the 1880s found in an abandoned mine shaft was sold for $87,400 at an auction in New Mexico. The vintage Levi's bore a label with the inscription “the only kind made by white labor”, a detail which, notwithstanding its starkly racist message, helped date the jeans to the period between 1882, which was after the U.S. Congress passed the Chinese Exclusion Act, banning Chinese laborers seeking to immigrate to the U.S., and the 1890s, when the company "reversed [its] policy and company leaders began speaking out against the nation’s racist policy”.

Corporate structure and staff

Levi Strauss & Co. is a worldwide corporation organized into three geographic divisions: Levi Strauss Americas (LSA), which is headquartered in San Francisco; Levi Strauss Europe (LSE), which is based in Brussels; and Levi Strauss Asia Pacific, Middle East and Africa.

Strauss passed the company to his nephews, the sons of David Stern, upon his death in 1902. Walter A. Haas, who married the daughter of David's fourth son, Sigmund Stern, became president in 1928, and the company remained under the ownership of the Stern-Haas family until first going public in 1971. However, in 1985, the Haas family recaptured ownership of the company, taking it private once again for the next 34 years. In February 2019, the company filed with the U.S. Securities and Exchange Commission for an initial public offering to be traded on the New York Stock Exchange under the ticker symbol LEVI. Levi Strauss went public for the second time in its history on March 21, 2019, at a price of $17 per share.

The company is also well known for promoting progressive causes. They were one of the earliest private sector institutions to support LGBTQ causes and, during the 2016 presidential campaign, donated $1 million to support immigration and LGBTQ rights. In 2018, CEO Chip Bergh published an op-ed in Fortune magazine, speaking out against gun violence.

In the first few months of the COVID-19 pandemic, the company experienced a 62% fall in sales and recorded a $364 million loss. Corporate leadership responded by cutting 700 office jobs in the hopes of saving $100 million in expenses.

Current products
As of 2019, the vast majority of Levi's are made overseas in a number of developing countries, such as Bangladesh, China, India, Sri Lanka, Vietnam, and Indonesia. Some styles in the "Levi's Premium" and "Levi's Vintage Clothing" lines are, however, made in the United States. The company produces much more than just jeans, including full lines of shirts, jackets, sweaters, underwear, socks, eyeglasses, accessories, dresses, skirts, and leather products. All jeans and pants are categorized by fit – skinny, slim, straight, bootcut, taper, relaxed, flare, and "big & tall" – identified by trademarked three digit numbers. The 501, the company's original modern design, is available in styles for both men and women. The rest of the 500 series is designed for men, and the 300, 400, 700, and 800 series are designed for women.

See also
Jean jacket
List of fashion designers

References

Further reading

External links

 
1930s fashion
1940s fashion
1950s fashion
1960s fashion
1970s fashion
1980s fashion
1990s fashion
2000s fashion
2010s fashion
2020s fashion
Multinational companies headquartered in the United States
Clothing brands
Clothing brands of the United States
American companies established in 1853
Clothing companies established in 1853
Retail companies established in 1853
Financial District, San Francisco
Jeans by brand
Progressivism in the United States
Liberalism in the United States
Manufacturing companies based in San Francisco
2019 initial public offerings
Companies listed on the New York Stock Exchange